= Ocloyas, Jujuy =

Coordinates: 23°56′38″S 65°13′55″W

Ocloyas (Jujuy)
- Rural municipality and village
- Interactive map of Ocloyas (Jujuy)
- Country: Argentina
- Province: Jujuy Province
- Time zone: UTC−3 (ART)

Ocloyas (Jujuy) is a rural municipality and village in Jujuy Province in Argentina.

== Location ==
47 km from the city of San Salvador de Jujuy by RP 35.
